Monique Waller Curi (born February 3, 1969 in Belo Horizonte, Minas Gerais, Brazil) is a Brazilian actress.

Career

Television

References

External links

1969 births
Living people
Brazilian telenovela actresses
People from Belo Horizonte